Indian Island can refer to several places:

Populated places
 Indian Island, Washington, an unincorporated community in Jefferson County, Washington state
 Penobscot Indian Island Reservation, near Old Town, Maine, known colloquially as Indian Island
 Indian Island 28, a Miꞌkmaq Indian reserve near Richibucto, New Brunswick, Canada

Islands
Indian Island (Lake Erie), in Maumee Bay, Michigan
Indian Island (Humboldt Bay), also known as Tuluwat Island or Gunther Island, in Eureka, California
Indian Island (South Oyster Bay) on Strongs Creek and the East West Channel in South Oyster Bay, Copiague, New York
Indian Island (New Zealand), in Tamatea / Dusky Sound, New Zealand

Fictional places
Indian Island is the name of the main setting in the novel And Then There Were None by Agatha Christie, also known as "Ten Little Indians".